Agyneta perspicua is a species of sheet weaver found in Canada and the United States. It was described by Dupérré in 2013.

References

perspicua
Spiders of Canada
Spiders of the United States
Spiders described in 2013